Ceppaloni is a comune (municipality) in the Province of Benevento in the Italian region Campania, located about 50 km northeast of Naples and about 9 km south of Benevento.

Ceppaloni borders the following municipalities: Altavilla Irpina, Apollosa, Arpaise, Chianche, Montesarchio, Roccabascerana, San Leucio del Sannio, San Nicola Manfredi, Sant'Angelo a Cupolo.

Ceppaloni is the birthplace of politician Clemente Mastella.

References

External links
 Official website
 

Cities and towns in Campania